Ali Hedyeh may refer to:
 Ali Hedyeh-ye Olya
 Ali Hedyeh-ye Pain